Daniel Omara Atubo is a Ugandan lawyer, educator and politician. He is the former Minister of Lands, Housing and Urban Development, in the Ugandan Cabinet, a position he served in from May 2006 until May 2011. In the cabinet reshuffle on 27 May 2011, he was dropped from the Cabinet. He represented "Otuke County", in present-day Otuke District in the Ugandan Parliament, between 1987 and 2011. He lost his re-election bid to parliament in March 2011.

Background and education
He was born in Otuke District, which at the time was part of Lira District, on 14 August 1947. Omara Atubo holds the degree of Bachelor of Laws (LLB) from Makerere University where he was Editor-In-Chief of the Makerere Law Journal in 1971. He also holds the Diploma in Legal Practice from the Law Development Center in Kampala.

Career
He started practicing law in 1974 and continues to practice up to today. He worked as a Senior State Attorney from 1972 until 1976. Between 1977 and 1979, he was a Senior Lecturer in Law in Moshi, Tanzania. Between 1985 and 1987, he served as Secretary, Bank of Uganda. During the late 1980s Omara Atubo served as Minister of State for Foreign Affairs, from 1987 until 1991. He was first elected to parliament in 1987 and was continuously a Member of Parliament until 2011. He was appointed as Minister of Lands, Housing & Urban Development, serving in that capacity from May 2006 until he was dropped from the Cabinet in May 2011.

Personal details
Omara Atubo is married. He lists personal interest in human rights, democracy, education, golf, walking and jogging. The web site of the Uganda Parliament lists his political affiliation as Independent. In the 2011 national elections, he lost the "Otuke County" seat in Parliament to Deusdedit Jacinto Ogwal of the Uganda People's Congress political party, who is he incumbent Member of Parliament for the constituency.

Controversy
On 15 April 1991 members of the National Resistance Council, the then Parliament, met to discuss a rebel screening programme set up in districts of Northern Uganda, which was causing divisions within the Ugandan Army. Following that meeting three men, including Omara Atubo, then a member of the Ugandan Cabinet, were arrested and charged, along with thirteen others, with treason. The case was later dismissed. Omara Atubo was dropped from the cabinet on account of those allegations.

Just prior to the 2006 presidential and parliamentary elections, Omara Atubo, then a member of the Uganda People's Congress (UPC) disagreed with Miria Obote, the party's president. Eventually Atubo left UPC and contested those elections as an Independent. He won and was offered a cabinet position in the ruling National Resistance Movement government, which he accepted.

See also
 Parliament of Uganda
 Cabinet of Uganda
 Otuke District

References

External links
 Website of the Parliament of Uganda
 Otuke District Internet Portal

1947 births
Living people
20th-century Ugandan lawyers
People from Otuke District
Government ministers of Uganda
Makerere University alumni
Members of the Parliament of Uganda
Uganda People's Congress politicians
Law Development Centre alumni
Lango people
People educated at St. Mary's College Kisubi
People from Northern Region, Uganda
21st-century Ugandan politicians
21st-century Ugandan lawyers